John Andrew Ward  (February 6, 1879 in New Lexington, Ohio – January 17, 1945 in Akron, Ohio), was a former professional baseball player who played 13 games in the outfield for the 1902 Brooklyn Superbas.

External links

1879 births
1945 deaths
Major League Baseball outfielders
Brooklyn Superbas players
Baseball players from Ohio
Seattle Siwashes players
Boise Fruit Pickers players
Salt Lake City Elders players
Tacoma Tigers players
People from New Lexington, Ohio